Pseudomyrophis nimius is an eel in the family Ophichthidae (worm/snake eels). It was described by James Erwin Böhlke in 1960. It is a marine, subtropical eel which is known from the Atlantic Ocean, including Angola, the Gulf of Mexico, and Florida Atlantic.

References

Fish described in 1960
nimius
Taxa named by Eugenia Brandt Böhlke